"Give It 2 Me" is a song by American singer and songwriter Madonna, featured on her 11th studio album Hard Candy. It was released on June 24, 2008, by Warner Bros. Records as the second single from the album. The song was written by Madonna as an anthemic, self-manifesto song which, although it appears to be about dance and sex, is a reference to Madonna's career spanning three decades in the music industry. Musically, "Give It 2 Me" is an upbeat dance-pop song, featuring instrumentation from West African percussion and cowbells. Backing vocals are provided by Pharrell Williams.

"Give It 2 Me" received positive reviews from contemporary critics. The song became Madonna's 39th number-one single on the Billboard Hot Dance Club Play chart. It charted on the Billboard Hot 100 for one week, and reached a peak of 57 only, due to limited radio play. The song topped the music charts in Hungary, the Netherlands and Spain, while it peaked within the top ten of the charts in many other nations, including Canada, Denmark and the United Kingdom.

The music video featured Madonna recreating her look from the Elle magazine May covergirl photo shoot, and was directed by photographer Tom Munro. Williams had a guest appearance in the video. It received positive response for her retro-inspired look. Madonna performed "Give It 2 Me" on both the promotional tour for Hard Candy, and the 2008–09 Sticky & Sweet Tour. The song was additionally performed at a special concert for The MDNA Tour at Madison Square Garden in 2012. "Give It 2 Me" received a Grammy nomination in 2009 in the Best Dance Recording category.

Writing and inspiration 
"Give It 2 Me" was written by Madonna and Pharrell Williams as a self-empowerment song. Ingrid Sischy from Interview magazine asked Madonna whether the song had the ability to become a party anthem in Ibiza. Madonna responded that she liked the idea of everybody dancing to "Give It 2 Me", treating it as a party anthem. When asked about the inspiration behind the song, Madonna said,
"It's ['Give It 2 Me'] very anthemic. I basically wrote it so I could have a great time doing it in a stadium. The words are very autobiographical. 'Got no boundaries, got no limits. [...] Don't stop me now. [...] If it's against the law, arrest me.' [...] Yes, that's me. It's the provocative me. The boring, predictable me."
In an interview with MTV Australia, Madonna explained that a prominent theme of the Hard Candy album was about incorporating the image of a boxer, an idea which has been repeated within the song. According to her, "['Give It 2 Me'] is basically [opposite in meaning]. I'm not [...], 'give me all you got' [kind of person], so it's quite a sort of tough stance." Initially, Madonna had decided that the title of the song was to be used for her then-unnamed album. This was changed following the release of a similarly named song by Timbaland.

Composition 

"Give It 2 Me" is an upbeat dance-pop song. Caryn Ganz of Rolling Stone said that the song has a club-like synth arrangement with a hip hop "feel to it". Chris Williams of Entertainment Weekly felt that the hip hop feel is brought about by the use of snare drums. According to the sheet music published by Alfred Publishing, the song is set in common time, with a medium dance tempo of 132 beats per minute. It is composed in the key of G minor, with Madonna's vocal range spanning from G3 to C5. The song has a basic sequence of Dm–Gm–E–F–Am–Dm as its chord progression.

"Give It 2 Me" starts with an offbeat rhythm and is accompanied by the sound of West African percussion. The song builds into a crescendo as Madonna sings the line, "If it's against the law, arrest me, if you can handle it, undress me". This is followed by synthesized musical arrangement, as Madonna starts singing the line, "When the lights go down and there's no one left, I can go on and on and on." An interlude, where Madonna continuously chants the words "Get Stupid", is also present. According to Miles Marshall Lewis of The Village Voice, the song contains elements of the work of Nile Rodgers.

"Give It 2 Me" is written as a self-manifesto song. Lyrically, though the song appears to be about dancing and sex, in reality Madonna uses sarcasm to emphasize the longevity of her career. The lyrics explain that she does not want to retire from her career at that moment and possesses the ability to continue, as noted in the lines "Don't stop me now, no need to catch my breath, I can go on and on and on."

Critical reception 

"Give It 2 Me" received critical acclaim from music critics. Elysa Gardner from USA Today called the song "thumping" and "breathless", naming it one of the standout tracks of the album. Caryn Ganz of Rolling Stone described "Give It 2 Me" as a "thumpy self-empowerment anthem". Mark Beech from Bloomberg Television complimented the track's "insidious beats". Sal Cinquemani of Slant Magazine called it "a little careerism on the dance floor", for the line "Give me a record and I'll break it". However, he criticised the "Get stupid" interlude, calling it "plain stupid". Jon Pareles from The New York Times, and Alexis Petridis of The Guardian, compared the song with Rick James' "Super Freak" (1981). Mark Savage from BBC described the song as "one of the [Hard Candy] record's few out-and-out pop moments, featuring a cute, bouncy beat, and a sense of humour that has been missing from Madonna's music since her Dick Tracy days." Tom Ewing of Pitchfork named the song as one of Hard Candys better tracks, possessing the album's "most urgent tune", stating that Madonna sings the lyrics "Show me a record and I'll break it/ I can go on and on" over "hard-pushing electro-ska whose keyboards break up trying to keep pace."

While reviewing Hard Candy, Chris Williams from Entertainment Weekly complemented the song, saying that with "tunes like 'Give It 2 Me' [Madonna's] unabashedly reviving the celebrative spirit of early singles like 'Lucky Star' and 'Holiday' filtering it through hip-hop's sonic boom." He also called it the most exciting club banger. Joan Anderman of The Boston Globe said that the song "thumps relentlessly, euphorically, to the rhythm of a clanking virtual cowbell and freaky bass." Joey Guerra from the Houston Chronicle complimented the "furious house grooves and thundering beats" of the song. "Give It 2 Me" was compared by Miles Marshall Lewis of The Village Voice, to the earlier Madonna song "Material Girl", and the music of producer Nile Rodgers. Pete Paphides of The Times noted how different Madonna sounded in songs like "Give It 2 Me", "Dance 2Night" and "She's Not Me" from the Hard Candy album. The song received negative feedback from Thomas Hauner of PopMatters, who said that "[the] West-African inspired percussion bridge — airdropped onto the album and randomly landing at this point — completely disrupts the song's full potential." While ranking Madonna's singles in honor of her 60th birthday, Jude Rogers from The Guardian placed "Give It 2 Me" at number 59, calling it "a half-annoying, half-brilliant EDM career manifesto".

 Chart performance 
In the United States, before its official release as a single, "Give It 2 Me" became the highest debut of the week on the Billboard Hot 100 at number 57, but dropped off the chart the following week. The song charted based solely on digital sales, and it debuted on the Hot Digital Songs chart at number 21, and at 41 on the Pop 100 chart. The track failed to gain airplay upon its release to radio. It topped the Billboard Hot Dance Airplay as well as the Hot Dance Club Play charts; it became Madonna's 39th number-one single on the latter chart. As of April 2010, the song has sold 316,000 digital units. Before it was officially released in Canada, the single debuted and peaked at number eight on the Canadian Hot 100 chart, becoming the week's highest debut. The single fluctuated on the chart for the next few weeks, but did not top its debut peak of eight. It was present for a total of 20 weeks on the chart.

"Give It 2 Me" entered the UK Singles Chart at number 73 the chart week of May 4, 2008, but fell off the chart the following week. It re-entered at number 25 the chart week of July 5, 2008, ultimately peaking at number seven. The song remained on the chart for a total of 19 weeks. According to the Official Charts Company, "Give It 2 Me" has sold 170,000 copies there. On the 2008 UK year-end singles chart, the song came in at number 73. In Australia, the song debuted at number 23, before descending off the chart.

In the Netherlands, the single debuted on the Dutch Top 40 chart at number 19. In its fourth week, the song rose to number one, and spent six weeks at the top. "Give It 2 Me" debuted at number one on Spanish Singles Chart and spent four weeks atop the chart. It also peaked within the top ten of the official charts of Austria, Belgium (Flanders and Wallonia), Czech Republic, Denmark, Finland, France, Germany, Ireland, Italy, Slovakia and Switzerland. "Give It 2 Me" received a platinum certification in Brazil and a gold certification in Denmark, by the Associação Brasileira dos Produtores de Discos (ABPD) and IFPI Denmark, for shipment of 60,000 and 7,500 copies respectively.

 Music video 
The music video was filmed on April 3, 2008, at the Sunbeam Studios in London, co-directed by fashion photographer Tom Munro and Nathan Rissman. The video was shot during Madonna's photo shoot with Elle magazine, for its May cover girl issue. Madonna's retro-chic look in the video was inspired by the photoshoot. The dresses were designed by several fashion brands, including Chanel and Roberto Cavalli.

According to MTV, elements from Madonna's 2006 Confessions Tour were included in the dance choreography. They added that "she's thrown in some new [choreography], an extended cameo by Pharrell and enough jewelry to give Mr. T an inferiority complex." Bill Lamb of About.com complimented Madonna's "stunning" body in the video, although she had turned 50 in the summer of 2008. He added that the video emphasized Madonna's "amazing staying power as one of the world's top pop stars for 25 years." In 2009, the video was included on Madonna's compilation, Celebration: The Video Collection.

 Live performances 

The song was performed during the promotional tour for the Hard Candy album, and the 2008–09 Sticky & Sweet Tour; both performances were similar. In the promotional tour, "Give It 2 Me" was performed as the fifth song of the setlist. Madonna wore a shiny black dress with black tails, Adidas track pants and high-heeled, lace-up boots. Every time the chorus played, Madonna and her back-up dancers jumped up and down, while waving their hands up in the air. The performance was backed by laser lights in the background and two movable screens, which displayed Williams, performing his lines.

In the Sticky & Sweet Tour, "Give It 2 Me" was performed as the closing song of the "Futuristic rave with Japanese influence" section. During the last segment of the show, Madonna wore a futuristic robotic dress with plates on her shoulder and a wig with long curled hair. She opened the breastplate from the previous performance, and started singing "Give It 2 Me". Parts of the lyrics of the song flashed on the screens in the style of a shooter video game, featuring 1980s games like Space Invaders and Asteroids. Gradually, more and more dancers joined Madonna, and together they started jumping on stage. Williams appeared on the screens to sing his lines. He made a special guest appearance, for the performances of "Give It 2 Me", at the Madison Square Garden stop of the tour. Near the end of the performance, Madonna asked the crowd to sing along with her while she shouted, "No one is ever going to stop me". The performance ended with video backdrops showing Madonna's sweaty, unsmiling, exhausted face, as she disappeared behind the reformed cubicle-shaped screens, which showed the words, 'Game Over', and "Holiday" started playing in the background.

Elements of the song were used in the opening number, "Girl Gone Wild", during The MDNA Tour in 2012. On November 13, 2012, during The MDNA Tour's second performance at Madison Square Garden in New York City, Madonna was joined onstage by Korean entertainer Psy. Together they performed a mashup of the song and "Gangnam Style". When introducing Psy, Madonna told the crowd that he "flew in all the way from Frankfurt, Germany this morning just to cheer your asses up!" During the performance, Madonna and Psy (who was wearing a bright red suit and his signature sunglasses) executed "Gangnam Style"s characteristic horse dance, and at one point Madonna pretended to be galloping along Psy's back. Joyce Chen of New York Daily News described the performance as a "spectacle," stating that the crowd "went wild."

 Track listings and formats 

 UK / EU CD1 "Give It 2 Me" (Album Version) – 4:47
 "Give It 2 Me" (Oakenfold Extended Mix) – 7:08

 UK / EU CD2 "Give It 2 Me" (Album Version) – 4:47
 "Give It 2 Me" (Oakenfold Drums In) – 5:45
 "Give It 2 Me" (Eddie Amador House Lovers Remix) – 7:56

 U.S. / EU maxi-single "Give It 2 Me" (Fedde le Grand Remix) – 6:40
 "Give It 2 Me" (Oakenfold Extended Remix) – 6:59
 "Give It 2 Me" (Oakenfold Drums In Mix) – 5:44
 "Give It 2 Me" (Eddie Amador Club) – 11:05
 "Give It 2 Me" (Eddie Amador House Lovers Remix) – 7:52
 "Give It 2 Me" (Tong & Spoon Wonderland Mix) – 7:35
 "Give It 2 Me" (Jody den Broeder Club) – 9:33
 "Give It 2 Me" (Sly and Robbie Bongo Mix) – 4:54

 U.S. 12" two vinyl setDisc 1
 "Give It 2 Me" (Album Version) – 4:47
 "Give It 2 Me" (Eddie Amador Club) – 11:05
 "Give It 2 Me" (Freddie Le Grand Remix) – 6:40
 "Give It 2 Me" (Eddie Amador House Lovers Mix) – 7:52
Disc 2
 "Give It 2 Me" (Oakenfold Extended Remix) – 6:59
 "Give It 2 Me" (Tong & Spoon Wonderland Mix) – 7:35
 "Give It 2 Me" (Jody den Broeder Club) – 9:33
 "Give It 2 Me" (Sly and Robbie Ragga Mix) – 4:57

 U.S. 12" Picture Disc Give It 2 Me (Album Version) – 4:47
 Give It 2 Me (Eddie Amador House Lovers Mix) – 7:52

 U.S. 7" vinyl'
 Give It 2 Me (Radio Edit) – 4:02
 Give It 2 Me (Eddie Amador Club 5 Edit / House Lovers Edit) – 4:56

Credits and personnel 
 Madonna – writer, co-producer, vocals
 Pharrell Williams – writer, additional vocals
 The Neptunes – producer
 Mark "Spike" Stent – audio mixing
 Andrew Coleman – mixing consoles

Charts

Weekly charts

Year-end charts

Certifications and sales

Release history

See also 
 List of Dutch Top 40 number-one singles of 2008
 List of number-one dance singles of 2008 (U.S.)
 List of number-one dance airplay hits of 2008 (U.S.)
List of Spanish number-one hits of 2008

References 

2008 singles
2008 songs
Madonna songs
Number-one singles in Spain
Number-one singles in Turkey
Record Report Pop Rock General number-one singles
Song recordings produced by Madonna
Song recordings produced by the Neptunes
Songs written by Madonna
Songs written by Pharrell Williams
Warner Records singles